The cabinet of Mihail Kogălniceanu was the government of Romania from 11 October 1863 to 26 January 1865.

Ministers
The ministers of the cabinet were as follows:

President of the Council of Ministers:
Mihail Kogălniceanu (11 October 1863 - 26 January 1865)
Minister of the Interior: 
Mihail Kogălniceanu (11 October 1863 - 26 January 1865)
Minister of Public Works:
Petre Orbescu (11 October 1863 - 6 May 1864)
(interim) Mihail Kogălniceanu (6 May - 19 July 1864)
Minister of the Interior, Agriculture, and Public Works: 
Mihail Kogălniceanu (19 July 1864 - 26 January 1865)
Minister of Foreign Affairs: 
Nicolae Rosetti-Bălănescu (11 October 1863 - 26 January 1865)
Minister of Finance:
Ludovic Steege (11 October 1863 - 21 January 1865)
(interim) Nicolae Rosetti-Bălănescu (21 - 26 January 1865)
Minister of Justice :
Alexandru Papiu Ilarian (11 October 1863 - 27 February 1864)
(interim) Petre Orbescu (27 February - 6 May 1864)
Petre Orbescu (6 May - 19 July 1864)
Minister of Religious Affairs:
Dimitrie Bolintineanu (11 October 1863 - 19 July 1864)
Minister of Justice and Culture :
Nicolae Crețulescu (19 July 1864 - 21 January 1865)
Grigore Bengescu (21 - 26 January 1865)
Minister of War:
Gen. Alexandru Iacovache (11 October 1863 - 12 April 1864)
Gen. Savel Manu (12 April 1864 - 26 January 1865)
Minister of Control:
(interim) Alexandru Papiu Ilarian (11 October 1863 - 27 February 1864)
(interim) Nicolae Rosetti-Bălănescu (27 February 1864 - 26 January 1865)

References

Cabinets of Romania
Cabinets established in 1863
Cabinets disestablished in 1865
1863 establishments in Romania
1865 disestablishments in Romania